The McClellan–Kerr Arkansas River Navigation System (MKARNS) is part of the United States inland waterway system originating at the Tulsa Port of Catoosa and running southeast through Oklahoma and Arkansas to the Mississippi River. It was named for two senators, Robert S. Kerr (D-OK) and John L. McClellan (D-AR), who pushed its authorizing legislation through Congress. The system officially opened on June 5, 1971. President Richard M. Nixon attended the opening ceremony. It is operated by the Army Corps of Engineers (USACE).

While the system primarily follows the Arkansas River, it also includes portions of the Verdigris River in Oklahoma, the White River in Arkansas, and the Arkansas Post Canal, a short canal named for the nearby Arkansas Post National Memorial which connects the Arkansas and White Rivers.

Through Oklahoma and Arkansas, dams artificially deepen and widen the modest-sized river to build it into a commercially navigable body of water. Along the section of the Arkansas River that carries the McClellan–Kerr channel, the river sustains commercial barge traffic and offers passenger and recreational use. Here, the system is a series of reservoirs.

Official change of significance
The U.S. Department of Transportation (USDOT) officially announced in early May 2015 that it had upgraded MKARNS from  "Connector" to "Corridor" on the National Marine Highway. The announcement also added the Oklahoma Department of Transportation (ODOT) as an official sponsor. 

In 2015, the USACE increased its designation of the MKARNS from a moderate-use to a high-use waterway system. The high-use designation means that a waterway carries more than 10 million tons per year, having a value of more than 12 million ton-miles per year.

Construction
The Arkansas River is very shallow through Arkansas and Oklahoma, and was naturally incapable of supporting river traffic through most of the year.  To allow for navigation, construction was started in 1963 on a system of channels and locks to connect the many reservoirs along the length of the Arkansas River.  The first section, running to Little Rock, Arkansas, opened on January 1, 1969.  The first barge to reach the Port of Catoosa arrived in early 1971.

Larger barge tows must be broken down and passed through the lock in sections, and rejoined on the opposite side.

The specifications for the channel itself are as follows:
Depth of channel:  or more.
Bridge clearance:  horizontal;  vertical.

ODOT says that the capacity of each barge could be increased by 200 tons for each foot of draft. The article quoted Lt. Col. Gene Snyman, then deputy commander of the U.S. Army Corps of Engineers’ Tulsa District, as saying such a project would cost about $170 million (2010 dollars).

Lock information

The following tables list the features of the navigation system, from the Mississippi River to the origin at the Port of Catoosa. Except as noted, all locks are on the Arkansas River.

There is no lock 11; sequentially, it would have been in the middle of Lake Dardanelle. Per the animated system map (see "External links"), Dardanelle Lock & Dam (lock 10), which forms Lake Dardanelle, is the highest facility on the system (54 feet between upper & lower pools); Ozark-Jeta Taylor Lock & Dam (lock 12), just above that lake, is the third highest (34 feet).  Thus, it is likely that those two facilities were redesigned, in terms of height and possibly location, so as to eliminate lock 11 as originally planned.  The Mississippi River lock is numbered lock 99 as it was added to the system after it was completed.

2019 Arkansas River flooding 

Extremely heavy rains hit the Arkansas River upstream of Keystone Dam during late May and early June 2019. So much water poured into the Keystone Reservoir in a short time that it quickly became evident that a major release of water would be needed to prevent overtopping the dam, causing devastating floods downstream. Even so, water rushed downstream toward MKARNS at such a high rate that officials at USACE halted barge traffic to avoid calamities such as collisions or hitting trees and debris afloat in the river.

By October, barge traffic was allowed on a limited basis. Normally, tows comprise twelve to sixteen barges. However, the flood carried so much silt down river that re-dredging would be required to return to normal traffic patterns. In October, the tows were limited to six barges (two wide and three deep).

The 2019 flood deposited about 1.5 million cubic yards of sediment into the waterway, As of February 2020, barge traffic remained limited by tow size and restricted to daylight hours only due to sediment. USACE expected to complete the dredging of sediment by late May 2020.

Waterway traffic control
The growth of business along MKARNS has greatly increased congestion at the locks. The Secretary of the Army has directed USACE to establish the following priorities for admitting vessels to each lock:
 Vessels owned by the U.S. government
 Commercial passenger vessels
 Commercial vessels (e.g., barges)
 Rafts
 Pleasure craft

There is no minimum size for watercraft using the locks. Craft as small as canoes, dinghies, and kayaks have all been allowed to use the locks, either alone or with multiple other vessels at the same time. If commercial traffic is heavy, pleasure craft may be required to wait approximately 1.5 hours or may be allowed to lock through with commercial vessels.

See also
 List of navigation authorities in the United States
 List of crossings of the Arkansas River

Notes

References

External links
Map of navigation system
History of the Arkansas River
US Army Corps of Engineers, Little Rock, Arkansas district navigation information
 Oklahoma Digital Maps: Digital Collections of Oklahoma and Indian Territory

Arkansas River
Waterways in the United States
Canals opened in 1971
Canals in Arkansas
Canals in Oklahoma
Infrastructure in Oklahoma